Purity Chepkirui (born 14 February 2003) is a Kenyan long-distance runner who specializes in the 1500 metres. She was the gold medallist at the World Athletics U20 Championships in 2021.

References

External links 

 Purity Chepkirui at World Athletics

2003 births
Living people
Kenyan female long-distance runners
World Athletics U20 Championships winners